The Johann Christian Frederick Rath House is a historic building located in Dubuque, Iowa, United States.  Rath settled in the Dubuque are from his native Hanover in 1851.  He was a wood worker, farmer and lead miner.  He acquired property along what is now Mt. Loretta Avenue and gave parcels to his children as they came of age.  Rath completed this house in 1853.  He died in 1881 and the house remained in the family until 1937.  The house is a 1½-story brick structure with a walk-out basement. The side-gable roof has a large dormer on the back that was created from two smaller dormers in 1940.  Also on the rear of the house is a full-length, two-story porch.  The house's general form, window shapes, chimney placement and its five-bay, symmetrical plan  suggests the Georgian Revival style.  It was listed on the National Register of Historic Places in 1977.

References

Houses completed in 1853
Houses in Dubuque, Iowa
National Register of Historic Places in Dubuque, Iowa
Houses on the National Register of Historic Places in Iowa
1853 establishments in Iowa